Happy Valley is an unincorporated rural community in King Township, York Regional Municipality, Ontario, Canada.

Geography
Happy Valley Forest is a  provincially significant ecological area located near the settlement.  It is classified as an Area of Natural and Scientific Interest by the Ontario Ministry of Natural Resources.

References

Communities in King, Ontario